Good to Be Alive is an album by Long John Baldry released in 1973. "Maggie Bell" was an acoustic tribute to the singer of Stone the Crows.

Track listing
"Good to Be Alive" (Colin Allen, Zoot Money) – 4:05
"Let Me Pass" (Bo Diddley) – 3:18
"Rake and Ramblin' Boy" (arranged by Baldry) – 3:27
"High and Low" (Jeff Thomas) – 3:43
"Gasoline Alley" (Rod Stewart, Ron Wood) – 3:39
"I Wish I Was a Rock" (Derroll Adams) – 1:18
"Up in the Trees" (Neil Shepherd) – 2:51
"Brand New Day" (Al Kooper) – 3:17
"Song for Martin Luther King" (Baldry) – 4:14
"Maggie Bell" (Baldry) – 3:06
"Let's Go" (Chas Jankel) – 2:39
"She" - duet with Lisa Strike (Chris Ethridge, Gram Parsons) – 4:38

Personnel
 Long John Baldry – 12-string guitar, vocals
 Dave Ball – guitar
 Denny Ball – bass guitar
 Terry Cox – drums 
 Jimmy Horowitz – keyboards 
 Sam Mitchell – steel guitar, dobro
 Chris Hughes – tenor saxophone
 Lesley Duncan, Lisa Strike, Susie Glover, Kay Garner – background vocals

Additional musicians
 Tony Newman – drums (tracks 5, 7)
 Mike Driscoll – drums (track 1)
 John Mealing – organ (track 1)
 Bob Cohen – guitar on (track 1)
 Andy Bown – acoustic guitar (track 9)
 Pete Stanley – banjo (tracks 5-7)
 John Field, Mike French – fiddle (tracks 5, 7)
 Lesley Duncan – lead vocal (track 3)
 Neil Shepherd – lead vocal (track 7)
 Liza Strike – lead vocal (track 12)
 The Pop Arts Strings – strings, brass

Technical
 Jimmy Horowitz – producer, arranger
 Andy Knight, Mike Claydon – engineers
 Steve Campbell – photography
 David Fields – cover art
 Mike Gill – cover design

Long John Baldry albums
Casablanca Records albums
1973 albums
Albums recorded at IBC Studios